The Stade Gustave-Delmotte is a football stadium in Hénin-Beaumont, France.

Historical  
The stadium was inaugurated Sunday, February 12, 1989, by Jacques Piette and Pierre Darchicourt.  It is a stadium with three fields of which the field of honor hosts the important game of the weekend.

Organization of courses

Field of honor  

On the main pitch is played the most important game of the weekend team meetings of the veteran Olympic Hénin club or matches of the teams of FCF Hénin-Beaumont, a women's club in town and occasionally by teams of  stage héninois.

The land is also used as a training ground for some teams. It is the only stadium field where the nets are removed outside games times to preserve them since the stadium is available to individuals outside normal hours.

Second Field 
The second field, located above the main pitch, is commonly used when a game is played on the field of honor. It is often the case that under 21s and other youth teams play on this field.

Third Field 
The third ground is very little used in Delmotte stadium unless the other two fields are occupied. On this one too, it is the under 21 teams that use this field.

Location  
The stadium is located at the end of the street Pierre Brosselette in Hénin-Beaumont in the direction of Rouvroy.  The stadium is accessible through the Tadao bus line in the direction towards Hénin-Beaumont-Rouvroy.

References  

Sports venues completed in 1989
Football venues in France
Sports venues in Pas-de-Calais